Belarus competed at the 2019 World Athletics Championships in Doha, Qatar from 27 September to 6 October 2019.

Results
(q – qualified, NM – no mark, SB – season best)

Men
Track and road events

Field events

Combined events – Decathlon

Women
Track and road events

Field events

References

External links
Doha｜WCH 19｜World Athletics

Belarus
World Championships in Athletics
2019